Victoria Acosta (born  1992) is an American singer from San Antonio, Texas, most known for the song "Could This Be Love" and as a 2013 contestant on American Idol.

Early life and career

Acosta was born in Houston and raised in San Antonio. Her parents, Ruben and Josie Acosta, enrolled her in a mariachi music school at age 6. She later studied voice with Latin Grammy Award nominee Manuel Vargas, a former lead singer of Mariachi Vargas de Tecalitlan. In 2000, at the age of eight, she won the title of Best Mariachi Music Vocalist in the United States at the Ford and Lincoln Mercury Mariachi Vargas Extravaganza.

Her pop music career began after being discovered in 2004 by writer/producer/artist manager Jeff Durand She was signed by Jeff Durand's independent record label and began recording "Once Upon A Time", her English debut album. It included the songs "The World's Gone Crazy" and "Could This Be Love", both written and produced by Jeff Durand, which became popular on Radio Disney.

American Idol

In January 2013, Victoria Acosta auditioned for American Idol and was selected by judges Randy Jackson, Mariah Carey, Keith Urban and Nicki Minaj, to advance to the trials in Hollywood, California.

For her American Idol audition, she sang a cover of Fergie's "Big Girls Don't Cry", and for the women's Hollywood rounds she sang "Killing Me Softly with His Song" by The Fugees.

She was eliminated from American Idol in the Hollywood group rounds.

Discography

Albums
 "Once Upon A Time"

Singles
 "The World's Gone Crazy"
 "Could This Be Love"
 "Once Upon A Time"
 "When I Lay Me Down To Sleep"
 "I'm Sorry"
 "Nothing Like A Friend"
 "Not This Time"
 "Move Your Thang"

References

1992 births
Living people
American child singers
American women pop singers
American mariachi musicians
Hispanic and Latino American musicians
American musicians of Mexican descent
Musicians from San Antonio
Singers from Texas
American Idol participants
21st-century American women singers
21st-century American singers
Hispanic and Latino American women singers